Bowers Peak is a peak,  high, forming a part of the divide between Hunter Glacier and Hoshko Glacier in the Lanterman Range, Bowers Mountains, a major mountain range situated in Victoria Land, Antarctica. The topographical feature was so named by the northern party of the New Zealand Geological Survey Antarctic Expedition, 1963–64, for Lieutenant John M. Bowers, Jr., of U.S. Navy Squadron VX-6, who flew support flights for this New Zealand field party. The peak lies situated on the Pennell Coast, a portion of Antarctica lying between Cape Williams and Cape Adare.

External links 

 Bowers Peak on USGS website
 Bowers Peak on the Antarctica New Zealand Digital Asset Manager website
 Bowers Peak on AADC website
 Bowers Peak on SCAR website
 Bowers Peak area satellite map

References 
 

Mountains of Victoria Land
Pennell Coast